This is a list of breakfast drinks, consisting of drinks that are or have formerly been commonly consumed at breakfast. This list consists of and is limited to very common breakfast drinks that have been denoted as such in various cultures and societies.

Common breakfast drinks

See also

 Champagne breakfast
 History of breakfast
 List of breakfast foods
 List of breakfast topics
 List of brunch foods

Notes

References

Further reading

External links
 * 
 

Lists of drinks
Breakfast